Andrew Joseph Lanza (born March 12, 1964) is an American lawyer and Republican politician. He is a member of the New York State Senate, representing the 24th district, which includes most of Staten Island. He was elected in 2006 after having served on the New York City Council for the 51st district.

Early life and career
Born in Brooklyn, Lanza grew up in Great Kills, Staten Island. He graduated from Monsignor Farrell High School in Oakwood in 1982.

He attended St. John's University, receiving a B.S. in Accounting. He obtained his Juris Doctor degree from Fordham University School of Law. He is admitted to practice law in New York, New Jersey, and United States District Courts for the Southern District of New York and New Jersey.

Before entering politics, Lanza was Managing Member and General Counsel Partner of Mercury Securities LLC, a Wall Street software development and stock trading firm. Previously, he was an Assistant District Attorney in the Manhattan District Attorney's Office and prosecuted street crimes, felony cases, New York State Welfare fraud, and procedural and constitutional issues. Lanza also was a senior auditor with KPMG Peat Marwick, where he audited public and private firms, banks, importers, and hospitals.

Lanza was first elected to the New York City Council as a Republican in 2001. At the time, he was one of three Republicans on the 51-member council. He was re-elected in 2003 and 2005.

Lanza lives in Great Kills with his wife, Marcele, a public middle school administrator, and their three children. He is a childhood friend of former U.S. Congressman Vito Fossella of Staten Island.

New York State Senate
Lanza was elected to the New York State Senate in 2006, replacing Senator John J. Marchi, who retired after holding the seat for 50 years. Since his initial election, he has won by large margins and been unopposed three times.

After Democrats took control of the state senate in the 2018 elections for only the third time since World War II, Lanza was the only Republican representing part of New York City.

Judicial Independence: On June 21, 2007, Lanza and Assemblyman Michael Cusick announced the enactment of a law establishing the 13th Judicial District, consisting solely of Richmond County and separating Staten Island from Brooklyn’s 2nd Judicial District. Although Staten Island accounted for mor than 15% of the 2nd Judicial District’s population, 91.6% of its elected judges were from Brooklyn.  Lanza introduced other legislation to increase the number of elected judges. In 2018 and 2019, the legislature established new elected Supreme Court seats.

Ending Child Marriage: Lanza and Assemblywoman Amy Paulin introduced a bill to end child marriage in New York by raising the age of consent from age 14 to 18. The bill addressed an issue highlighted in a New York Times Op-Ed, "America's Child-Marriage Problem.” The piece stated: "A survey by the Tahirih Justice Center, an NGO that provides services to immigrant women and girls, identified as many as 3,000 known or suspected forced-marriage cases just between 2009 and 2011, many involving girls under age 18." Lanza's bill passed the Senate unanimously and Governor Andrew Cuomo signed it into law.

I-STOP: New York's Internet System for Over-Prescribing Act, or I-STOP, passed unanimously, with Lanza taking the lead in the senate and Assemblyman Michael Cusick a primary sponsor in the State Assembly. The bill was signed into law in 2012 effective in 2013.  I-STOP established New York as the first state to mandate that physicians consult a database of a patient's prescription history before prescribing certain drugs. It also made New York the largest state to require real-time data exchange between pharmacists and doctors.

Safe Disposal: Lanza joined Assemblyman Michael Cusick to enact bipartisan legislation that established a dedicated Safe Disposal program allowing New Yorkers to safely dispose of expired and unneeded prescription drugs all year long at dedicated locations, including local police precincts.

Fentanyl Analogs: In October, 2017 Governor Andrew Cuomo joined with Senator Lanza, Assemblyman Michael Cusick, and District Attorney Michael McMahon to announce a series of actions to combat the fentanyl crisis on Staten Island and across New York State. The Governor promoted legislation to add 11 fentanyl analogs to the state controlled substances schedule. The bill gave law enforcement the ability pursue the dealers who manufacture and sell these drugs. According to the Staten Island Advance, "On Staten Island, fentanyl-related deaths increased more than 700 percent from 2015 to 2016. In 2015, there were seven fentanyl-related deaths which jumped to 58 in 2016." In 2018, the US Drug Enforcement Administration approved an emergency order placing "all illicit fentanyl analogues not already regulated by the Controlled Substances Act into Schedule I - the category for substances with no currently accepted medical use-for two years" The State Legislature enacted the law in 2020, closing the fentanyl loophole.

In 2011, Lanza voted against the Marriage Equality Act, stating he believed marriage should "describe a union between a man and a woman." The bill passed the Senate 33-29, legally recognizing same-sex marriages performed in New York. 

In December 2013, Lanza took issue with an American Atheists’ billboard in Times Square. He issued a press release stating "people who do not believe in God are hateful and malicious,” likening the billboard to "religious persecution of the kind that similarly lead to the Holocaust.” He called for a boycott of Times Square while the billboard was up and for the IRS to investigate the American Atheists’ tax-exempt status. American Atheists responded by asking if he would call for a business boycott in his own district if a similar billboard were there, and they replicated the Times Square billboard in Staten Island. Lanza issued a press release stating that his assumptions of malice and hatred were targeted at the billboard supporters, not all atheists. He later relented on his calls for an IRS investigation and a boycott of Times Square.

See also
List of New York State Senators
2009 New York State Senate leadership crisis

References

External links
New York State Senate: Andrew J. Lanza

|-

1964 births
Living people
Fordham University alumni
Fordham University School of Law alumni
New York City Council members
New York County Assistant District Attorneys
Republican Party New York (state) state senators
People from Brooklyn
St. John's University (New York City) alumni
21st-century American politicians
Monsignor Farrell High School alumni
Politicians from Staten Island
American people of Italian descent